Our Daily Bread Ministries (formerly RBC Ministries) is a Christian organization founded by Dr. Martin De Haan in 1938. It is based in Grand Rapids, Michigan, with over 600 employees.  It produces several devotional publications, including Our Daily Bread. The ministry produces radio and television programs along with an online university program called Christian University GlobalNet.

History
As a Christian organization, it was originally called the "Detroit Bible Class" when it was founded in 1938, it later became known as "Radio Bible Class".  In 1994 the name was changed to RBC Ministries, and in 2015, the name was changed to Our Daily Bread Ministries.

Its founder, Dr. M. R. De Haan, led the organization until 1965. Richard De Haan took over in 1965 and led the organization until 1985.  Richard's son, Mart De Haan, was the president until October 5, 2011, when the presidency was handed over to his brother, Rick.

Courses
Our Daily Bread University (ODBU), formerly Christian University GlobalNet, is an online learning platform offering a collection of courses provided by the ministries. It provides online resources for learners of all levels in topics such as Bible, Theology, Leadership, Christian Apologetics and more. Its courses provide reflection questions, tests, and a Certificate of Completion for each completed course.

ODBU partners with other organizations—such as the Association of Christian Schools International (ACSI)—in fulfilling Christian Philosophy of Education and other continuing education requirements, and NewWay Ministries.  The ministry expands its reach under the name Our Daily Bread University by adding additional courses from global leaders, translations of the core curricula into multiple languages, and through partnering with on-site education and training centers.  While all courses are available in English, the organization also provides a number of its courses in Spanish, Chinese, Portuguese, Russian, and Arabic.

Media
The publishing arm of Our Daily Bread Ministries is called Our Daily Bread Publishing.  The ministry publishes one of the most widely read devotional booklets printed, with over 10 million per issue, in 37 languages. The daily devotionals are also distributed via short radio spots. The same dual publishing method is used for My Utmost for His Highest, a collection of writings by Oswald Chambers. Our Daily Bread Ministries also publishes a series of booklets called The Discovery Series.  The ministry's radio show is Discover the Word that originated with Haddon Robinson, Alice Matthews and Mart De Haan.  The current hosts include Mart DeHaan, Bill Crowder, and Elisa Morgan.  Brian Hettinga is the producer.

The ministries produced a television program, Day of Discovery, which aired on stations throughout the United States and Canada.  Many of the programs were hosted by the founder's grandson, Mart De Haan. Originating in 1968, it was one of the longest running Christian television programs in the United States. At first, it was filmed on location at Cypress Gardens located in Winter Haven, Florida, but that was later changed to using various locations around the world. The Day of Discovery programs are also available online.

Our Daily Bread Ministries publishes the Discovery Series, Bible-based topical booklets that address issues in today's culture.

Locations 
Our Daily Bread Ministries have 35 offices world-wide:

Notable teaching staff
As of June 2020, the following scholars have authored courses:

References

External links
 

Christian mass media companies
Religion in Grand Rapids, Michigan
Protestantism in Michigan
Christian organizations established in 1938
Christian organizations established in the 20th century
Organizations based in Grand Rapids, Michigan
1938 establishments in Michigan
Christian educational organizations
Online colleges
Educational technology companies of the United States